Medford Area Senior High School (known as MASH) is a public secondary school located in Medford, Wisconsin. MASH is the only high school in the Medford Area Public School District.

History
The current high school building was built in 1968. The high school formerly occupied the old middle school building on Clark Street. The current building includes a gymnasium known locally as "Raider Hall", an auditorium known locally as the "Red and White Theatre", and a swimming pool known as "Raider Pool".

Athletics
The following sports are currently offered at MASH:

 Baseball
 Boys Basketball
 Girls Basketball
 Boys Soccer
 Girls Soccer
 Cross-Country
 Curling
 Football
 Golf
 Gymnastics
 Boys Hockey
 Girls Hockey
 Softball
 Swimming
 Tennis
 Track
 Volleyball
 Wrestling

Medford was a member of the Lumberjack Conference which consisted of Phillips, Northland Pines, Lakeland, Ashland, Park Falls, and Tomahawk. This conference lasted until 2007, when they joined the newly formed Great Northern Conference. Other teams in the Great Northern Conference include Lakeland, Mosinee, Antigo, Rhinelander, Tomahawk, and Northland Pines. The team name is the Medford Raiders and their colors are red and white.

Clubs
MASH currently offers the following clubs:

 Art Club
Audio/ Visual Club
Battle of the Books
 Chess Club	
 DECA/FBLA
 Dance Team
 Drama Club
 FFA
 Forensics
 International Club
 History Club
 Intramurals Club
 Key Club
 Library Club
 Math League
 National Honor Society
 Raider Horizon Club
 Rocketry Team
 Science Club
 Science Olympiad
 Student Council
 Weight Lifters
 Rollerblading

Departments
Agriculture
Art
Business and Information Technology
English
Family and Consumer Education
Foreign Language
Math
Music
Physical Education
Science
Social Studies
Special Education
Technology

References

External links
 MASH Homepage

Education in Taylor County, Wisconsin
Schools in Taylor County, Wisconsin
Public high schools in Wisconsin